Darüşşafaka, meaning "home of compassion" in Ottoman Turkish, may refer to:

 Darüşşafaka Society, a Turkish educational association founded to train apprentices
 Darüşşafaka High School, a school in Maslak, Istanbul, Turkey
 Darüşşafaka Basketbol, a professional basketball club based in İstanbul
 Darüşşafaka (Istanbul Metro), a railway station in Istanbul
 Darüşşafaka, a neighbourhood in the Sarıyer district of Istanbul.

tr:Darüşşafaka